North Yuyanq’ Ch’ex (formerly "North Suicide Peak") is a  mountain in the U.S. state of Alaska, located in Chugach State Park.

Location 
North Yuyanq’ Ch’ex is located on the southern edge of Chugach State Park, in Alaska, and is positioned between South Yuyanq’ Ch’ex, Homicide Peak, Avalanche Peak, and Rabbit Lake.

Access and recreation 
North Yuyanq’ Ch’ex is accessible via the popular Falls Creek, McHugh Creek, and Rabbit Lake trails. In the summer months, it is a rugged but non-technical climb that is typically completed as a day trip from nearby Anchorage, Alaska. The peak can be climbed in all seasons but is most popular in the summer and fall, when the majority of the mountain is snow-free.

References 

Mountains of Alaska
Mountains of Anchorage, Alaska